Zündorf Synagogue (German: Synagoge Zündorf) was a synagogue and cemetery in Cologne, Germany. Zündorf was an important trading center, of Jewish farmers, butchers, moneylenders, small artisans or goods dealers from the early 18th century.

History
The Jewish history of Zündorf dates back to before 1700. The first historical evidence is the burial of the Jew Ishar on July 2, 1708 at the Deutz cemetery, which was also the last resting place for the Jews of Zündorf until the creation of a separate graveyard in 1923. The Jewish cemetery of Zündorf still has eight graves with six gravestones.

Architecture
The two-storey building was made of brick and had a gable roof. It was 6.7 metres wide and 8.9 metres deep.  The floor area was only 59.6 square metres. 
From the main road, it could only be reached via a  branch path that led past an old building.

In the west of the synagogue there were three large windows (1,50 × 2,50 m) and two arched windows. Two windows, which were rebuilt in 1938 into living space windows, lay at the back of the synagogue and another high window at the north-western corner of the house. This was bricked up.

Further reading
 Elfi Pracht: Jüdisches Kulturerbe in Nordrhein-Westfalen. Band 1: Regierungsbezirk Köln (= Beiträge zu den Bau- und Kunstdenkmälern im Rheinland. Bd. 34, 1). J. P. Bachem, Köln 1997, S. 261, 291, 309 (Abb 181).
 Reinhard Rieger: Die Zündorfer Judengemeinde. In: Unser Porz. Beiträge zur Geschichte von Amt und Stadt Porz. Heft 12, 1970, S. 1–50.

References

Cemeteries in Cologne
Synagogues in Cologne
Synagogues in North Rhine-Westphalia
Former synagogues in Germany